Goblin mode is a neologism for the rejection of societal expectations in a hedonistic manner without concern for one's self-image. While usage of the term dates back to 2009 with varying definitions, the term went viral in 2022 due to a tweet by a Twitter user featuring a doctored news headline of an interview with actress Julia Fox, purporting her to have used the phrase. The image prompted a large increase in online searches for goblin mode, leading Fox to clarify she did not use the term. Goblin mode has also been linked to a viral Reddit post in which a user admits to acting "like a goblin" when alone at home.

The term quickly became viral on social media platforms such as TikTok, often as a response to other trends such as cottagecore or self-improvement. In April 2022, business magnate Elon Musk posted an image macro implicitly attributing his proposed acquisition of Twitter, Inc. to him being in "goblin mode". In June 2022, the term was defined on Dictionary.com as "a slang term for a way of behaving that intentionally and shamelessly gives in to and indulges in base habits and activities without regard for adhering to social norms or expectations". In December 2022, online respondents selected the term from Oxford Languages' shortlist, which also included metaverse and #IStandWith, as the Word of the Year.

The popularity of goblin mode may be linked to a rejection of the perceived carefully curated lifestyles often presented by social media users. The trend has also been linked to a manner of coping with the effects of the COVID-19 pandemic on society since this is described as a way of life that gives people permission to reject societal norms and embrace their basic instincts.

See also
 Goblincore
 Tang ping
 Deviance (sociology)

References

External links 
 Going Into Goblin Mode -is it Good or Bad?  article by Divya Toshniwal

2022 neologisms